Eddie McAteer (25 June 1914 – 25 March 1986) was an Irish nationalist politician in Northern Ireland.

Born in Coatbridge, Scotland, McAteer's family moved to Derry in Northern Ireland while he was young. In 1930 he joined the Inland Revenue, where he worked until 1944. He then became an accountant and more actively involved in politics. While his brother, Hugh, became a prominent Irish republican, involved in the Irish Republican Army (IRA) and Sinn Féin, Eddie chose constitutional nationalist politics. He was elected as the Nationalist Party (Northern Ireland) Member of Parliament for Mid Londonderry in the 1945 Northern Ireland general election. He was a founder member of the Anti-Partition League of Ireland, and became its vice chairman in 1947, then its chairman in 1953.

In 1952, McAteer was elected to Londonderry Corporation, and the following year he switched to represent Foyle in the Northern Ireland House of Commons. He left the City Council in 1958, and became the Deputy Leader of the Nationalist Party at Stormont. He became prominent in the campaign calling for the establishment of a university in Derry.

In 1964, he became the leader of the Nationalist Party, and the following year accepted the post of Leader of the Opposition thereby conferring de facto recognition of the Northern Irish government (by Nationalists) for the first time. Several years later he lost his seat in the 1969 Northern Ireland general election to John Hume. While in his early career, he had been a militant nationalist, publishing Irish Action – a call for civil disobedience – with the start of The Troubles, he repeatedly called for moderation.

In the 1970 United Kingdom general election, McAteer stood in Londonderry on the Unity slate, taking 36.6% of the vote. He again contested Londonderry in the Northern Ireland Assembly, 1973 election, taking only 3,712 votes and narrowly missing being elected. With the ascendancy of the Social Democratic and Labour Party, the Nationalist Party was in disarray. McAteer took his remaining supporters into the Irish Independence Party in 1978, in which his son Fergus became prominent.

References

Sources
Northern Ireland Parliamentary Elections Results: Biographies, election.demon.co.uk; accessed 27 May 2017.

1914 births
1986 deaths
Leaders of political parties in Northern Ireland
Members of the House of Commons of Northern Ireland 1945–1949
Members of the House of Commons of Northern Ireland 1949–1953
Members of the House of Commons of Northern Ireland 1953–1958
Members of the House of Commons of Northern Ireland 1958–1962
Members of the House of Commons of Northern Ireland 1962–1965
Members of the House of Commons of Northern Ireland 1965–1969
Nationalist Party (Ireland) members of the House of Commons of Northern Ireland
People from Coatbridge
Councillors in Derry (city)
Members of the House of Commons of Northern Ireland for County Londonderry constituencies
Politicians from North Lanarkshire